David Gelles is an American journalist and author. He is a business reporter for The New York Times and writes its Corner Office column.

Books
The Man Who Broke Capitalism: How Jack Welch Gutted the Heartland and Crushed the Soul of Corporate America — and How to Undo His Legacy (Simon & Schuster, 2022)
Mindful Work: How Meditation is Changing Business from the Inside Out (2015)

References

External links
Official website
David Gelles - The New York Times

American journalists
Year of birth missing (living people)
Living people